Grande Rocheuse (4,102 m) is a summit on the east ridge of Aiguille Verte in the Mont Blanc massif in Haute-Savoie, France

See also

List of 4000 metre peaks of the Alps

Mountains of the Alps
Alpine four-thousanders
Mountains of Haute-Savoie